The 2023 season will be the Chicago Bears' upcoming 104th season in the National Football League and their second under the head coach/general manager tandem of Matt Eberflus and Ryan Poles. The Bears will attempt to improve from their 3–14 season from the previous year and make the playoffs after a two year absence.

Draft

Staff

Current roster

Preseason
The Bears' preseason opponents and schedule will be announced in the spring.

Regular season

2023 opponents
Listed below are the Bears' opponents for 2023. Exact dates and times will be announced in the spring.

References

External links
 

Chicago
Chicago Bears seasons
Chicago Bears